Seated Nude is a 1916 oil on canvas painting by Amedeo Modigliani, now in the Courtauld Gallery. The painting is one of a famous series of nudes that Modigliani painted between 1916 and 1918, which include many of his most famous works. Its model was Beatrice Hastings, then the artist's lover.

References

1916 paintings
Paintings by Amedeo Modigliani
Paintings in the collection of the Courtauld Institute of Art
Nude art